is a Japanese former swimmer. He competed in two events at the 1968 Summer Olympics.

References

External links
 

1950 births
Living people
Japanese male butterfly swimmers
Olympic swimmers of Japan
Swimmers at the 1968 Summer Olympics
Universiade medalists in swimming
Sportspeople from Miyazaki Prefecture
Asian Games medalists in swimming
Asian Games gold medalists for Japan
Asian Games bronze medalists for Japan
Swimmers at the 1966 Asian Games
Medalists at the 1966 Asian Games
Universiade silver medalists for Japan
Universiade bronze medalists for Japan
Medalists at the 1970 Summer Universiade
20th-century Japanese people